Phosphanides are chemicals containing the [PH2]− anion. This is also known as the phosphino anion or phosphido ligand. The IUPAC name can also be dihydridophosphate(1−).

It can occur as a group phosphanyl -PH2 in organic compounds or ligand called phosphanido, or dihydridophosphato(1−). A related substance has PH2−. Phosphinidene (PH) has phosphorus in a −1 oxidation state.

As a ligand PH2 can either bond to one atom or be in a μ2-bridged ligand across two metal atoms. With transition metals and actinides, bridging is likely unless the metal atom is mostly enclosed in a ligand.

In phosphanides, phosphorus is in the −3 oxidation state. When phosphanide is oxidised, the first step is phosphinite ([H2PO]−). Further oxidation yields phosphonite ([HPO2]2−)and phosphite ([PO3]3−).

The study of phosphine derivatives is unpopular, because they are unstable, poisonous and malodorous.

Formation 
Alkali metal phosphanides can be made from phosphine and the metal dissolved in liquid ammonia. Sodium phosphanide can also be made from phosphine and triphenylmethyl sodium. Lithium phospahnide can be made from phosphine and butyl lithium or phenyl lithium.

Another way to produce -PH2 complexes is by hydrolysis of a -P(SiMe3)2 compound with an alcohol, such as methanol.

Yet another way is to remove a hydrogen atom from the phosphine in a phosphine complex by using a strong base.

Properties 
When calcium phosphanide is heated, it decomposes by releasing phosphine and yielding the phosphanediide: CaPH. With further heating a binary calcium phosphide is formed. Other compounds may also lose hydrogen as well as phosphine.

Phosphanides can react with CCl4 to substitute Cl for H giving a -PCl2 compound. Similarly CBr4 can produce -PBr2. Also AgBF4 can react to yield -PF2.

Sodium phosphanide can react with ethyl alcohol in a diethyl carbonate solution to yield sodium 2-phosphaethynolate (NaOCP). Na(DME)2OCP is also formed from NaPH2 when reacted with CO in a dimethoxyethane (DME) solution under pressure.

List

Derivatives
Some derivatives of phosphanides have also been studied where hydrogen is substituted by another group. They include  bis(trimethylsilyl)phosphanide, bis (triisopropylsilyl) phosphanide, bis (trimethylsilyl) phosphanide, diphenyl phosphanide.

References

Phosphines
Ligands